Atlas Delmenhorst is a German association football club from the city of Delmenhorst, Lower Saxony who play in the fourth-tier Regionalliga Nord.

The club, originally formed in a merger in 1973, folded in 2002 after declaring insolvency but was reformed a decade later in 2012. The club's previous greatest success was to play in the Regionalliga Nord, then at tier three level, for three seasons from 1995. The club has also made two appearances in the DFB-Pokal, first in 1980–81 and then again, after reforming, in 2019–20.

History
SV Atlas Delmenhorst was formed on 13 July 1973 when three local Delmenhorst clubs, FC Roland, VSK Bungerhof and SSV Delmenhorst, merged with the support of local building equipment manufacturer Atlas Weyhausen GmbH. The new club took up the stadium of SSV, built in 1930, the Stadion an der Düsternortstraße, as its home ground as FC Roland's was too small and VSK neither had a football team nor a stadium.

The new club quickly rose through the league system, winning promotion to the tier four Landesliga Niedersachsen in 1975. Atlas won this league as a freshly promoted side and moved up to the tier three Oberliga Nord for the 1976–77 season. The club played for six seasons in the league until 1983 when an eighteenth place finish meant relegation again. In between the club finished as high as fourth place in the league in 1979–80. It also made a single appearance in the DFB-Pokal for 1980–81, reaching the fourth round, eliminating 2. Bundesliga sides Rot-Weiß Oberhausen and Kickers Offenbach on the way before being knocked-out by Borussia Mönchengladbach.

Atlas was back in the highest league of Lower Saxony, the tier four Verbandsliga, from 1983 to 1986, taking out league titles in 1984 and 1986. It failed to win promotion to the Oberliga in 1984 but succeeded in 1986. After two difficult Oberliga seasons the club was relegated back to the Verbandsliga in 1988. The club struggled for a number of seasons in the Verbandsliga and came close to relegation but recovered and finished runners-up in 1992 and 1994. The latter qualified the club for the new Oberliga Niedersachsen/Bremen when the Regionalliga Nord was established as the new third tier in Northern Germany and the Oberliga Nord was replaced by two regional leagues.

Atlas finished runners-up in the new Oberliga in 1995, too and won promotion to the Regionalliga. The club struggled in this league in the three seasons there, never finishing above twelfth place and being relegated again in 1998. Back in the Oberliga the club came thirteenth in 1999. With the loss of support from long term sponsor Atlas Weyhausen the fortunes of the club declined. It played three more seasons in the western division of the Verbandsliga Niedersachsen and was renamed to Delmenhorster SC in October 1999. It came last in the league in 2001–02 and had to declare insolvency, being eventually stricken from the register of clubs. On 10 June 2002, Eintracht Delmenhorst was formed to take over and continue the youth department of Atlas, with the latter de-registered.

On 4 April 2012, the football department of Eintracht Delmenhorst split from the club to form the new Atlas Delmenhorst club, taking over Eintracht's league place. Atlas won promotion from the Kreisliga to the tier seven Bezirksliga in 2013–14, where it played for two seasons until a league championship took it up to the Landesliga. In the subsequent year the club won the Landesliga Weser-Ems, earning promotion to the Niedersachsen Oberliga. 

In 2019, Delmenhorst won the Niedersachsenpokal, a local amateur cup tournament, and thus qualified for the 2019–20 DFB-Pokal. The club was knocked-out in the first round by Werder Bremen.

Honours

League
Oberliga Niedersachsen/Bremen
 Runners-up: 1995
Verbandsliga Niedersachsen
 Champions:  (3) 1976, 1984, 1986
 Runners-up: (2) 1992, 1994
 Bezirksliga Weser-Ems 2
 Champions: 2016
 Landesliga Weser-Ems
 Champions: 2017

Cup
 DFB-Pokal
 Last sixteen: 1980–81

Recent seasons
The recent season-by-season performance of the club:

 With the introduction of the Regionalligas in 1994 and the 3. Liga in 2008 as the new third tier, below the 2. Bundesliga, all leagues below dropped one tier.

References

External links
  

Football clubs in Germany
Football clubs in Lower Saxony
Association football clubs established in 1973
1973 establishments in West Germany